William Williamson Anderson (27 November 1894 – 16 June 1973) was a Scottish cricketer from Fife.

A right arm paceman, Anderson took 1663 wickets at 8.54 for his club side Dunfermline. He also captained Scotland from 1934 to 1937 and took his career best innings figures of 6 for 51 against the touring Indians in 1932.

He served as President of the Scottish Cricket Union in 1946.

External links
Cricket Europe

1894 births
1973 deaths
Scottish cricketers
Cricketers from Dunfermline